Lowville can refer to:

Places
United States
Lowville Township, Minnesota
Lowville, Minnesota
Lowville (town), New York
Lowville (village), New York
Lowville, Wisconsin, a town
Lowville (community), Wisconsin, an unincorporated community